Obukhov (masculine) or Obukhova (feminine) may refer to:
Obukhov (surname) (or Obukhova), Russian last name
Obukhov Defense, a labour revolt in 1901
Obukhov (inhabited locality) (or Obukhova), several rural localities in Russia
9914 Obukhova, a main belt asteroid

See also
 Obukhiv, a city in Ukraine
Obukhovo, several rural localities in Russia
Obukhovsky (disambiguation)